Sayella mercedordae is a species of minute sea snail, a marine gastropod mollusk in the family Pyramidellidae, the pyrams and their allies.

Description
The shell grows to a length of 2.1 mm.

Distribution
This species occurs in the following locations:
 Cape Verde

References

External links
 To Encyclopedia of Life

Pyramidellidae
Gastropods described in 1997
Gastropods of Cape Verde